Cirsonella extrema is a species of sea snail, a marine gastropod mollusk in the family Skeneidae.

Description
The height of the yellowish white shell attains 2.7 mm, its diameter 2.9 mm. The spire contains 3½ whorls. The round aperture is somewhat oblique. The peristome has a thickened callus, expanded on the left side. Its top is attached to the penultimate whorl. it covers mostly the umbilicus. The brownish operculum is rather thick and consists of polygyrous spirals.

Distribution
This marine species occurs in Antarctic waters off the South Shetland Islands at depths between 311 m and 426 m.

References

 Engl W. (2012) Shells of Antarctica. Hackenheim: Conchbooks. 402 pp.

extrema
Gastropods described in 1912